ICU commonly refers to:
Intensive care unit, a special department of a hospital
ICU may also refer to:

Organisations

Universities
Information and Communications University, South Korea
Istanbul Commerce University, Istanbul, Turkey
International Christian University, Mitaka, Tokyo, Japan
International Christian University – Kyiv, Ukraine
Imperial College Union, the students' union of Imperial College London

Politics
Industrial and Commercial Workers' Union, a South African political group from the 1920s
Industrial and Commercial Workers' Union (Ghana), a general union in Ghana
Internationalist Communist Union, an international grouping of Trotskyist political parties
Islamic Courts Union, a rival administration in Somalia

Other organisations
ICU Medical, an American company
International Cheer Union, the worldwide governing body of cheerleading
Investment Capital Ukraine, a Kyiv-based financial group
International Clearing Union, a 1944 currency exchange regulatory institution proposal

Arts and entertainment
 I.C.U. (film), a 2009 Australian thriller
 Inner City Unit, a British band

 "ICU", a song by 69Boyz from the album The Wait Is Over, 1998
 "ICU", a song by Phoebe Bridgers from the album Punisher, 2020
 "ICU (Madison's Lullabye)", a song by Demi Lovato from the album Dancing with the Devil... the Art of Starting Over, 2021
 "I.C.U.", a song by Adore Delano from the album After Party, 2016

Other acronyms
.icu, an Internet top-level domain
International Components for Unicode, software libraries supporting internationalization
Intersection capacity utilization, a measure of the capacity of a roadway intersection

See also
I See You (disambiguation)